Wendo may refer to:

 Wendo Kolosoy, a musician from the Democratic Republic of the Congo
 Wondo Genet, (also transliterated Wendo Genet), a resort town in Ethiopia
 Aleta Wendo, a town in southern Ethiopia
 Aleta Wendo (woreda), an administrative region in Ethiopia 
 Wen-Do, a self-defense technique